FDM may refer to:

Science and technology
 Fat in dry matter, a food content measurement
 Finite difference method, a numerical method for solving differential equations
 Free Download Manager, a download manager for Windows and macOS
 Frequency-division multiplexing, a signal multiplexing method
 Functional Database Model, a technique in business and financial planning
 Fused deposition modeling, a 3-D printing technique, see: FFF
 Fascial distortion model, an anatomical and physiological model of medicine

Other
 fdm (software), a program to fetch, filter and deliver email
 FDM Group, a British IT service company
 Federation of Danish Motorists
 Funeral doom metal
 First degree murder